Dr. Alexander Thomson (1800
– 1 January 1866) was elected as the first mayor of Geelong and held the position on five occasions from 1850 to 1858. Thomson was the first settler in the area known as Belmont, a suburb of Geelong and called his homestead Kardinia, a property now listed on the Register of the National Estate.

Early life

Thomson was the son of Alexander Thomson, a shipowner of Aberdeen, Scotland, baptised 28 March 1798. He was educated at Dr Todd's school at Tichfield, Aberdeen University, and at London, where he studied under Sir Everard Home and qualified for the medical profession. In March 1824 he married Barbara Dalrymple.

Emigration to colonial Australia
In 1825 Thomson sailed to Tasmania (then Van Diemen's Land) as a surgeon on a convict ship, the first of several voyages made by him. He was then in comfortable circumstances having been left a sum of £9500 by his mother. In 1831 he decided to settle in Tasmania, and bringing with him his wife and daughter, obtained a grant of 4000 acres (16 km²) of land.

In 1832 Thomson bought two small steamers and established a service between Hobart and Kangaroo Point. He, however, sold both vessels during the next two years. He became interested in the colonisation of Port Phillip District, but did not join the Port Phillip Association, though invited to do so, and in November 1835 he sent across the first cattle to arrive in the new settlement, a draft of 50 Hereford cows. In March 1836 Thomson arrived with his wife and daughter. He came over as medical officer and catechist for the Port Phillip Association, and built a house near the corner of Flinders and Elizabeth streets, Melbourne. In May he acted as one of three arbitrators in connexion with disputes between Henry Batman and John Pascoe Fawkner, and before his house was completed he was in the habit of holding a service on Sunday in his tent.

Thomson was secretary to the first public meeting held in Melbourne, on 1 June; in October William Lonsdale appointed him medical officer at a salary of £200 a year. He resigned this position in January 1837.

Geelong
Having selected land on the present site of Geelong, Thomson settled there. He did some exploring, acquired more land in several localities, and in 1846 held about 150,000 acres (600 km²). He was a director of the Port Phillip bank, which was a failure, and the Port Phillip Steam Navigation Company, and he was the first to make cash advances on wool. He was foremost in every movement connected with Geelong from the removal of the bar at the mouth of the harbour to the founding of a mechanics' institute. He also took much interest in church affairs and in the well-being of the aborigines. In these matters he gave not only time, he also spent considerable sums of money.

The town was incorporated in 1849, then having 8000 inhabitants, and, as was fitting, Thomson was elected its first mayor. He field this position again in 1851, 1855, 1856 and 1857. He had been elected a member of the New South Wales Legislative Council as one of the representatives of the Electoral district of Port Phillip in 1843, but as it was difficult to attend the meetings at Sydney, soon resigned. He was active in the anti-transportation movement, in 1852 was elected a member of the Victorian Legislative Council for Geelong, and brought in and passed a bill incorporating the "Geelong and Melbourne Railway Company". Thomson presided at the first meeting of shareholders and was one of the directors. The line was completed in 1857. In the meanwhile Thomson had resigned his seat in the council, and visited England where he found he could get no information about the Australian colonies bills. There had been a change of ministers and Lord John Russell, now in charge of the colonial office, had gone to Vienna. Thomson followed him there, obtained an interview, and got a promise that there would be a separate constitution bill for the colony of Victoria. In May 1855 Lord John Russell sent him a copy of the bill which soon afterwards became law.

In 1857 Thomson was elected member for Geelong in the Victorian Legislative Assembly but resigned in April 1859. Thomson was elected member for Geelong East in October 1859, holding this seat until July 1861. His many activities had led to the neglect of his own financial affairs, and towards the end of his life he accepted the position of medical officer to the Sunbury boys' home. He died at Geelong on 1 January 1866 and was buried in the old Geelong cemetery. His wife and a daughter survived him.

The suburb of Thomson was named after Dr. Thomson as well as Thomson Street Belmont, the nucleus of the Belmont Heights Estate which was until the first World War, part of his extensive rural property. A parish of the Uniting Church in Australia and the Alexander Thomson Cricket Club, competing in the Geelong Cricket Association, was also named after him.

References

Additional resources listed by the Australian Dictionary of Biography:
Garryowen (E. Finn), The Chronicles of Early Melbourne, vols 1–2 (Melb, 1888)
T. F. Bride (ed), Letters from Victorian Pioneers (Melb, 1898)
H. G. Turner, A History of the Colony of Victoria, vols 1–2 (Lond, 1904)
R. H. Croll and R. R. Wettenhall, Dr. Alexander Thomson: A Pioneer of Melbourne and Founder of Geelong (Melb, 1937)
A. D. Gilchrist (ed), John Dunmore Lang, vols 1–2 (Melb, 1951)
P. L. Brown (ed), Clyde Company Papers, vols 2–5 (Lond, 1952–63).

External links
Alexander Thomson Cricket Club

1798 births
1866 deaths
Alumni of the University of Aberdeen
19th-century Australian medical doctors
Mayors of Geelong
Scottish emigrants to colonial Australia
Members of the New South Wales Legislative Council
Members of the Victorian Legislative Assembly
Members of the Victorian Legislative Council
19th-century Australian politicians
19th-century Australian public servants
19th-century Australian businesspeople